Canada competed at the 1968 Summer Paralympics in Tel Aviv, Israel from November 4 to 13, 1968. The team finished twelfth in the medal table and won a total of nineteen medals; six gold, six silver and seven bronze. The Canadian team contained twenty-five athletes; eighteen men and seven women.

This was Canada's first appearance at a Paralympic Games.

Medalists

See also
 Canada at the 1968 Summer Olympics

Notes

References

Nations at the 1968 Summer Paralympics
1968
Paralympics